Greengross is a surname. Notable people with the surname include:

 Alan Greengross (1925–2018), British politician
 Sally Greengross, Baroness Greengross (born 1935), British politician
 Wendy Greengross (1925–2012), British general practitioner and broadcaster

See also
 Greencross